The ISBR Business School (International School of Business & Research), is an autonomous management institute located in India. The first campus was established under the aegis of the Bangalore Education Trust. ISBR is in Bangalore Karnataka. ISBR has close relationships with several institutions such as AICTE, AIMA, Annamalai University, Bangalore University, Madras Management Association, British Standard Institution – Six Sigma, Captsone Business Simulation Games.

Courses

Full-time Courses

Bengaluru Campus

Masters of Business Administration 
Masters of Business Administration (MBA) from Bangalore University is a two-year full-time program provided by the institute. The course is recognized by AIU, UGC, Ministry of HRD, and Government of India.

PGDM 
The Post Graduate Degree in Management is approved by AICTE, Ministry of HRD, and Government of India. This is offered at ISBR Bangalore Campus (Autonomous), providing MBA and NBA accreditation.

Chennai Campus

Masters of Business Administration 
Masters of Business Administration (MBA) from Mysore University is a two-year programme offered by the institute.

Selection Procedure 
Admissions at ISBR Business School are based on the performance in the ISBR Written Test, Group Discussion, and Personal Interview. However, candidates who have appeared for MAT, CAT, ATMA, GMAT, XAT or PGCET are exempted from the ISBR Written Test.

Facilities

Physical Infrastructure 
The institute offers infrastructural facilities like seminar halls, board rooms, discussion rooms, classrooms and exclusive facilities for tutorial workshops.

Library 
The institute provides books, periodicals, journals and magazines. The library also subscribes to a host of online databases such as ProQuest and Thomson Learning.

Computer labs 
ISBR campuses have computer labs with internet and multimedia facilities.

Hostels 
The institute offers separate boarding and lodging facilities for men and women.

Faculty 
The faculty at ISBR includes thinkers, consultants and advisors. Dr. Y Lakshman Kumar of ISBR selected as Outstanding Faculty amongst Business Schools at the Edufuture Excellence Awards, 2021.

References 

'ISBR Talent Connect Drive'
'ISBR Case Study Club Activity - The ability to analyse'
'ISBR HR Club Activity - Dishing out some delicacies'
'Full of nostalgia and gratitude'
'Students must have will-power'
'A day to honour talents'
'Students should become entrepreneurs: Nair'

External links 
 ISBR official Site

Business schools in Bangalore